The 2000 New Mexico State Aggies football team was an American football team that represented New Mexico State University in the Big West Conference during the 2000 NCAA Division I-A football season. In their fourth year under head coach Tony Samuel, the Aggies compiled a 3–8 record. The team played its home games at Aggie Memorial Stadium in Las Cruces, New Mexico.

Schedule

References

New Mexico State
New Mexico State Aggies football seasons
New Mexico State Aggies football